Dakatia  Union is a union parishad under Bhaluka Upazila of Mymensingh District in the division of Mymensingh, Bangladesh.

Geography 
Dakatia Union is bounded by Kachina, Uthura, Bharadoba, Malikabari Union.

Demographics 
According to the National Bureau of Statistics of Bangladesh census report, the number of population was 41,474 in 2011.

References 

Unions of Bhaluka Upazila